Finland was represented by Jarkko and Laura, with the song "Kuin silloin ennen", at the 1969 Eurovision Song Contest, which took place on 29 March in Madrid.

Before Eurovision

National final
The Finnish Final was held on 22 February at the YLE TV Studios in Helsinki. It was hosted by Tauno Vainio. The winner was chosen by postcard voting and the results were announced on 4 March.

At Eurovision
On the night of the final Jarkko and Laura performed last in the running order, following Portugal. The entry was conducted by Ossi Runne. At the close of voting, Finland picked up 6 points and placed 12th of the 16 entries.

Voting

References

External links
Viisukuppila, Muistathan: Suomen karsinnat 1969 
Finnish national final 1969 on natfinals

1969
Countries in the Eurovision Song Contest 1969
Eurovision